Greenville is a town in Madison County, Florida, United States. The population was 746 at the 2020 census, down from 843 at the 2010 census.

Geography
Greenville is located in western Madison County at  (30.467, –83.635). U.S. Route 90 passes through the north side of the town, leading east  to Madison, the county seat, and northwest  to Monticello. U.S. Route 221 passes through the center of town, leading south  to Perry and north  to Quitman, Georgia. I-10 leads west  to Tallahassee, the state capital, and east  to Lake City.

Demographics

2020 census
Note: the US Census treats Hispanic/Latino as an ethnic category. This table excludes Latinos from the racial categories and assigns them to a separate category. Hispanics/Latinos can be of any race.

As of the 2020 United States census, there were 746 people, 329 households, and 199 families residing in the town.

2000 census
As of the census of 2000, there were 837 people, 331 households, and 220 families residing in the town. The racial makeup of the town was 27.36% White, 72.04% African American, 0.12% Native American, 0.12% Asian, 0.12% from other races, and 0.24% from two or more races. Hispanic or Latino of any race were 0.24% of the population.

There were 331 households, out of which 33.8% had children under the age of 18 living with them, 33.8% were married couples living together, 27.5% had a female householder with no husband present, and 33.5% were non-families. 31.4% of all households were made up of individuals, and 16.9% had someone living alone who was 65 years of age or older. The average household size was 2.53 and the average family size was 3.16.

In the town, the population was spread out, with 31.3% under the age of 18, 7.2% from 18 to 24, 24.4% from 25 to 44, 19.0% from 45 to 64, and 18.2% who were 65 years of age or older. The median age was 35 years. For every 100 females, there were 83.2 males.  For every 100 females age 18 and over, there were 70.1 males.

The median income for a household in the town was $20,060, and the median income for a family was $21,484. Males had a median income of $23,750 versus $17,368 for females. The per capita income for the town was $11,128.  About 26.4% of families and 32.9% of the population were below the poverty line, including 48.5% of those under age 18 and 25.7% of those age 65 or over.

Education

Greenville Elementary School is a part of the District School Board of Madison County. Secondary school students go to the PreK–8 Madison County Central School, which serves Greenville students for middle school, and Madison County High School.

The Suwanee River Regional Library System operates the Greenville Library.

Notable people
 Ray Charles, childhood home of R&B icon
 Geno Hayes, linebacker for Florida State, Tampa Bay Buccaneers, Chicago Bears and Jacksonville Jaguars
 Chris Thompson, running back for Florida State, Washington Redskins, and the Jaguars

References

External links

 
 http://users.wildblue.net/pricec123/ray_charles_memorial.htm
 Preservation Magazine's article on the Ray Charles Childhood Home

Towns in Madison County, Florida
Towns in Florida